G. Marcus Cole is the Joseph A. Matson Dean and Professor of Law at the Notre Dame Law School. 

He is an expert on the law of bankruptcy, corporate reorganization, and venture capital.

Biography

Education 
Cole obtained his bachelor's degree in applied economics from Cornell University in 1989, and then studied law at Northwestern University, where he received his J.D. in 1993.

Career 
He became an associate with the Chicago law firm of Mayer Brown, and then clerked for Judge Morris S. Arnold of the U.S. Court of Appeals for the Eighth Circuit. 

He joined the faculty of Stanford Law School in 1997 and was Wm. Benjamin Scott and Luna M. Scott professor of law. He also taught for Law Preview, the law school prep course. 

He has also served on the editorial board of the Cato Supreme Court Review, the advisory board of the Independent Institute's Center on Culture and Civil Society, the academic advisory board of BARBRI, and as a member of the U.S. Court of Appeals for the Ninth Circuit’s Bankruptcy Judicial Advisory Committee. 

Other civic and charitable organizations he served on the board of include the Central Pacific Region of the Anti-Defamation League of B’nai B’rith and Businesses United in Investing, Lending and Development (BUILD). He also served as president of the board of directors of Rocketship Education and was served on the board of trustees of Bellarmine College Preparatory.

Notre Dame 
In 2019, he was appointed Joseph A. Matson Dean of the Law School and professor of law at the University of Notre Dame by University President Rev. John I. Jenkins, C.S.C. He started his term on July 1 of that year.

Personal life 
Cole is a practicing Catholic. His son, Claude, plays football at the University of Wyoming.

Publications 
Delaware is Not a State: Are We Witnessing Jurisdictional Competition in Bankruptcy?, 55 Vanderbilt Law Review 1845-1916 (November 2002).

References

External links
 Cole at Stanford Law School
 Law Preview Professors Page

Year of birth missing (living people)
Living people
Northwestern University Pritzker School of Law alumni
Stanford Law School faculty
American legal scholars

African-American Catholics
Central Catholic High School (Pittsburgh) alumni